Sărdănești may refer to several villages in Romania:

 Sărdănești, a village in Plopșoru Commune, Gorj County
 Sărdănești, a village in Bala Commune, Mehedinți County